Didi is an Angolan football player. He has played for Angola national team.

National team statistics

References

External links

Living people
Angolan footballers
Association football defenders
Year of birth missing (living people)
Angola international footballers